J.P. Turner & Company was an independent broker-dealer founded in 1997 by investment professionals Tim McAfee and Bill Mello.

The company moved from being a traditional brokerage firm to a full-service investment banking, advisory services and brokerage firm, with advisory services available through J.P. Turner & Company Capital Management, LLC. 

J.P. Turner & Company was headquartered in Atlanta had some 180 independent branches nationwide. 

The firm shut down in July 2015.

References

External links 
J.P. Turner Website 
J.P. Turner Website for Prospective Representatives 
J.P. Turner & Company Capital Management Website 
Investment News J.P. Turner Broker-Dealer Profile 
Investment Advisor's Top 25 Broker-Dealers 
RCS Capital Announces Agreement to Acquire J.P. Turner 

Financial services companies established in 1997
Financial services companies of the United States